Pooviriyum Pulari is a 1982 Indian Malayalam-language feature film, produced by G Premkumar, TS Roy and Prasad Chandran and directed by G Premkumar, starring Shankar, Rajalakshmi and Rajkumar Sethupathi. The film has a musical score by Jerry Amaldev. Mammootty appears in an extended cameo role. The film is an emotional family drama.

Cast

Shankar as Balan
Rajalakshmi as Nandini
Mammootty as Ramesh
Ambika as Renuka 
Rajkumar Sethupathi as John
Sukumari as Madhavi
Captain Raju as Reghu's Father
Kuthiravattam Pappu as Nandini's Brother
Mala Aravindan
Prathapachandran as Balan's Father
Sreenath as Reghu
Nellikode Bhaskaran as Mammadh

Soundtrack
The music was composed by Jerry Amaldev with lyrics by Poovachal Khader.

References

External links
 

1982 films
1980s Malayalam-language films
Films scored by Jerry Amaldev